Cornufer desticans is an arboreal frog in the family Ceratobatrachidae.  Scientitsts have seen it in two places: Barora Island and Choiseul Island, both in the Solomon Islands.

References

Frogs of Asia
Amphibians described in 2008
Endemic fauna of the Solomon Islands
desticans